Kaala Rathri is a 1987 Indian Malayalam film, directed by K. S. Gopalakrishnan and produced by Diana. The film stars Jagathy Sreekumar, Sathaar, Anuradha and Bheeman Raghu in the lead roles. The film has musical score by A. T. Ummer.

Cast
Jagathy Sreekumar
Sathaar
Anuradha
Bheeman Raghu
Janardanan

Soundtrack
The music was composed by A. T. Ummer and the lyrics were written by Poovachal Khader.

References

External links
 

1987 films
1980s Malayalam-language films